Farfadet (Q7) was an early submarine built for the French Navy at the beginning of the 20th century.  She was of the Maugas type, and  the name ship of her class. Farfadet accidentally sank in July 1905 at Bizerte with the loss of 14 men of her crew; two men survived. She was later refloated and recommissioned as the Follet'' (Q7). She was stricken in November 1913.

Design and constructionFarfadet was ordered by the French Navy under its 1899 building programme, the lead ship of a class of four. She was designed by Gabriel Maugas, an early French submarine engineer, and was built at the Naval Dockyard in Rochfort. She was single-hulled, and powered by two Sautter-Harlé electric motors, with a power output of 300 cv. Farfadet was laid down in September 1899, launched on 17 May 1901, and entered service on 29 August 1902.

Service history
The submarine is remembered chiefly for the accident of 6 July 1905, off the coast of Tunisia, which killed 14 of its crew. The details of the catastrophe, once released by the press, horrified France and drew national attention to the dangers of submarines, which the French Ministry of Marine was at that time investing a great deal of money in. After the Farfadet accident and the recent British  submarine disaster (June 1905), sailors began to refer to submarines as "iron tombs". 

On 6 July 1905, during a routine patrol en route from Sidi Abdallah to Bizerte, in Tunisia, Farfadet sank suddenly, taking 14 of her crew with her. Only two escaped, being on deck when the incident occurred. A rescue attempt failed and the crew were lost. Farfadet was raised a week later, restored and recommissioned on 17 December 1908 under the name Follet ("Will-o-the-wisp"). She remained in service for five years before being stricken in November 1913.

 Name 
Farfadet means "merry spirit" and is a type of sprite or goblin in French folktale. The goblin is present in the folklore of the south of France, the Vendée and Poitou.

 French naval buildup 
In the early 1900s the French Navy made a concerted effort to build up its submarine fleet. The Times of London on 5 April 1904 notes that "26 submersibles of various types" were being developed by its nearest neighbour, with a total of 47 on the drawing board. At this time the vessels were listed as:

Submarines: Morse, Français, Algeríen, Naïade, Protée, Lynx, Ludion, Gnôme, Lutin, Loutre, Castor, Gustave Zédé, Gymnote, Perle, Esturgeon, Bonité, Thon, Sontfleur, Dorade, Farfadet, Korrigan.

Submersibles: Narval, Siréne, Triton, Silure, EspadonAccident

As reported in The TimesThe Times of 7 July 1905 reports that, on a routine cruise after leaving the port of Sidi Abdullah in French Tunisia, Farfadet, heading for its home port of Bizerte in Tunisia, attempted to dive with a "skylight" (hatch) improperly shut. The guard officer tried to force it closed and then, mistakenly, tried to open it and slam it shut again. The submarine had by this point submerged; the force of the water forced the hatch down in a skewed position from which it would not move. As the submarine dived the hatch was forced from its place entirely and the guard captain blown from his position by the force of the water. Four sailors in the bow were drowned, and the weight of water in the flooded forward section caused Farfadet to dip and dive straight down, where it became embedded in the mud at the bottom of the harbour.

Alternative version
 
Submarine pioneer John P. Holland wrote in How To Fly Like a Bird (1906) that Farfadet had moved in such a way as to upset her ballast tank, which in turn submerged an open hatch. A similar fate was suffered by the British A8, which had spun onto its side while trying to avoid a trawler, dipping its conning tower underwater and so flooding itself, "excepting that in [Farfadets] case there occurred a change of speed or inclination that caused the water in her partially filled tank to move to her forward end, thus causing the common centre of gravity of the boat, and the water in its tanks, to move far enough forward to force the forward part of the boat under water. This unexpected manoeuvre, combined with her speed, forced the top of her turret under and she took enough water on board to send her to the bottom."

Attempted rescue and salvageThe Times of 7 July 1905 records that at 9am on 7 July, divers reached Farfadet and found that the crew were responding to knocks. Four hawser (steel) cables were wrapped around the submarine in preparation for the arrival of a 20-ton pontoon and crane, belonging to the Hersen Company. At 3.20pm the vessel was raised, its aft portion breaking the water so that airlocks could be opened and the air inside renewed for the surviving crew. Attempts were then made to ground the submarine in shallow water, but at 12.45 the next morning the crane broke, sending the submarine back to the bottom of the harbour. Further efforts to recover it, involving the French steamer Audax, were in vain.

On 15 July 1905, Farfadet'' was raised using a floating dock and towed to the harbour of Sidi Abdallah. That night work began on removing the bodies. The four in the forward compartment had died instantly, the eight aft when the crane had broken. It was found that the sailors had attempted to plug the airholes with their tunics. Two more bodies were found amidships.

It was found that the sulfuric acid of the engine's accumulators (batteries) had combined with the seawater to create hydrochloric acid, which had eaten away the instruments and bodies and made work on retrieval impossible until ventilators had been fitted to the aft of the vessel. The last of the crew had died after being trapped for 32 hours. Eight of the 14 crew were from Brittany.

References

Bibliography

External links

Farfadet (Q7) at sous-marins français Marc Castel (archived page) (French)

Farfadet-class submarines
Ships built in France
1901 ships
French submarine accidents
Maritime incidents in 1905
Shipwrecks in the Mediterranean Sea